Glen Elder may refer:

 Glen Elder, Kansas, a small city
 Glen Elder Dam, impounding Waconda Lake, near Glen Elder, Kansas
 Glen Elder (sociologist)